Jorge Araya may refer to:

 Jorge Araya (footballer, born 1924) (1924–1992), Chilean football forward
 Jorge Araya (footballer, born 1996), Chilean football midfielder for Deportes Melipilla